Mihăiță Székely (born 8 September 1972) is a retired Romanian football midfielder.

References

1972 births
Living people
Romanian people of Hungarian descent
Romanian footballers
ACS Foresta Suceava players
FC Steaua București players
CSM Reșița players
CFR Cluj players
Association football midfielders
Liga I players

Romanian sportspeople of Hungarian descent